Deh Now (also Romanized as Deh-e Now) is a village in Saadatabad Rural District, Pariz District, Sirjan County, Kerman Province, Iran. At the 2006 census, its population was 380, in 91 families.

References 

Populated places in Sirjan County